The 1957 New Jersey gubernatorial election was held on November 5, 1957. Incumbent Democrat Robert B. Meyner defeated Republican nominee Malcolm Forbes with 54.55% of the vote. This was the first time in the state's history that a governor was elected to two four-year terms.

Primary elections
Primary elections were held on April 16, 1957.

Democratic primary

Candidates
Robert B. Meyner, incumbent Governor

Results

Republican primary

Candidates
Malcolm Forbes, State Senator from Somerset County
Wayne Dumont, State Senator from Warren County

Results

General election

Candidates
Malcolm Forbes, State Senator from Somerset County and billionaire publisher (Republican)
Henry B. Krajewski, Secaucus tavernier and perennial candidate (American Third)
Robert B. Meyner, incumbent Governor (Democratic)
Winifred O. Perry, insurance broker and former Verona councilman (Conservative)
Albert Ronis, chicken veterenarian and perennial candidate (Socialist Labor)
Anthony D. Scipio, Newark real estate broker (American)

Results

References

1957
New Jersey
Gubernatorial
November 1957 events in the United States